William Tecumseh Sherman Fitch III (born 1963) is an American evolutionary biologist and cognitive scientist at the University of Vienna (Vienna, Austria) where he is co-founder of the Department of Cognitive Biology.

Fitch studies the biology and evolution of cognition and communication in humans and other animals, and in particular the evolution of speech, language and music. His work concentrates on comparative approaches as advocated by Charles Darwin (i.e., the study of homologous and analogous structures and processes in a wide range of species).

Fitch was born in Boston and received his B.A. (1986) in biology and his Ph.D. (1994) in Cognitive and Linguistic Sciences from Brown University. From 1996 to 2000, he worked as a Postdoctoral fellow at MIT and Harvard University. He was a lecturer at Harvard University and a reader at the University of St Andrews, before moving to a professorship at the University of Vienna in 2009.

He bears the name of his third generation great grandfather, Civil War General William Tecumseh Sherman, as did his father and grandfather before him.

Ability of monkeys to speak 

Fitch and colleagues used x-ray recordings of a macaque monkey named Emiliano producing various sounds to make a model of Emiliano's vocal tract. The model showed that a macaque could produce a variety of vowel and non-vowel phonemes adequate for intelligible speech. In a simulation, "Emiliano" said "Will you marry me?" in a recognizable manner, demonstrating that the anatomy of monkeys does not limit them from producing complex speech. In conclusion, Fitch stated that "If a human brain were in control, they could talk".

Bibliography 
 Fitch, W. T. (2010) The Evolution of Language. Cambridge: Cambridge University Press.
 Fitch, W. T. (1997). "Vocal tract length and formant frequency dispersion correlate with body size in rhesus macaques," Journal of the Acoustical Society of America 102: 1213–1222.
 Fitch, W. T. (2000). "The evolution of speech: a comparative review," Trends Cog. Sci. 4, 258–267.
 Fitch, W.T. and D. Reby (2001), "The descended larynx is not uniquely human". Proceedings of the Royal Society, B, 268(1477): 1669–1675. 
 Hauser, M. D., Chomsky, N. & Fitch, W. T. (2002). "The Language Faculty: What is it, who has it, and how did it evolve?" Science 298: 1569–1579. 
 Fitch, W. T., & Hauser, M. D. (2004). "Computational constraints on syntactic processing in a nonhuman primate". Science 303: 377–380. 
 Fitch, W. T. (2005). "The evolution of language: A comparative review," Biology and Philosophy 20: 193–230.
 Fitch, W. T. (2006). "The biology and evolution of music: A comparative perspective," Cognition 100: 173–215.

See also 
 Biolinguistics
 Biomusicology
 Cognitive biology
 Comparative psychology
 Digital infinity
 Descended larynx
 Evolutionary psychology
 Hoover (seal)
 Origin of language
 Origin of speech
 Origin of music
 Vocal learning

References

External links 
 Homepage of W. Tecumseh Fitch at homepage.univie.ac.at
  Darwin's Theory of Music and Language Evolution
 Science at the interfaces: the biology of music and language — a keynote speech at the EuroScience Open Forum (ESOF) 2010 in Torino

Brown University alumni
Academics of the University of St Andrews
Harvard Fellows
Academic staff of the University of Vienna
Evolutionary psychologists
Evolutionary biologists
American cognitive scientists
1963 births
Living people
European Research Council grantees